is a former Japanese football player.

Playing career
Sakamoto was born in Saitama on February 24, 1978. After graduating from Nippon Sport Science University, he joined J1 League club JEF United Ichihara (later JEF United Chiba) in 2000. He became a regular player as right side midfielder from summer 2001. He also played as defensive midfielder not only right side midfielder. He played all matches in league competition except for one game for suspension in 2004 until 2006. The club won the champions J.League Cup for 2 years in a row (2005-2006). In 2007, he moved to Albirex Niigata. He played in all 34 matches as left side back and left midfielder. In 2008, he returned to JEF United Chiba. He played many matches as right side back. However the club results were bad and was relegated to J2 League first time in the club history from 2010. His opportunity to play also decreased from 2010 and he retired end of 2012 season.

Club statistics

Honors and awards
Team
J.League Cup Champion: 2005, 2006

References

External links

1978 births
Living people
Nippon Sport Science University alumni
Association football people from Saitama Prefecture
Japanese footballers
J1 League players
J2 League players
JEF United Chiba players
Albirex Niigata players
Association football midfielders